Jeffrey E. Johnson (born March 20, 1971) is an American politician. He is a member of the South Carolina House of Representatives from the 58th District, serving since 2014. He is a member of the Republican party.

Johnson is Chair of the House Legislative Oversight Committee.

References

Living people
1971 births
Republican Party members of the South Carolina House of Representatives
21st-century American politicians
Coastal Carolina University alumni
Mississippi College School of Law alumni